Caohejing Hi-Tech Park is the name of a subway station on Shanghai Metro Line 9. It is located at Hongmei Road and Caobao Road.

External links

Railway stations in Shanghai
Line 9, Shanghai Metro
Shanghai Metro stations in Xuhui District
Railway stations in China opened in 2007